Peter William McBride (July 9, 1875 – July 3, 1944) was a pitcher in Major League Baseball. He pitched in one game for the Cleveland Spiders in 1898 and then was transferred to the St. Louis Perfectos before the 1899 season along with most of the Spiders' better players. He pitched in 11 games for the Perfectos, ending his major league career.

External links

Major League Baseball pitchers
Cleveland Spiders players
St. Louis Perfectos players
Bangor Millionaires players
Belfast Pastimes players
Taunton Herrings players
Manhattan Jaspers baseball players
Springfield Ponies players
Springfield Maroons players
Baseball players from Massachusetts
1875 births
1944 deaths
19th-century baseball players
People from Adams, Massachusetts
Sportspeople from Berkshire County, Massachusetts